Matsys is the surname of a family of Flemish painters:

 Quentin Matsys (1466–1530)
 Cornelis Massijs (1508–), son of Quentin Matsys
 Jan Matsys (–1575), son of Quentin Matsys
 Quentin Metsys the Younger (–1589), son of Jan Matsys